Darlington Railway Athletic Football Club is a football club based in Darlington, England.

History
The club was formed after World War I and initially played in the Darlington & District League. They joined the Northern League in 1919, but left at the end of the 1924–25 season after finishing second-from-bottom, returning to the Darlington & District League. They were league champions in 1932–33 and 1963–64, and League Cup winners in 1950–51. They did the double of league and League Cup in 1967–68. The club subsequently joined the Teesside Football League. In 1969–70 the club won the North Riding Cup. They finished bottom of the Teesside League in 1986–87, but were runners-up in 1988–89.

In 1990 the club joined Division Two of the Wearside League. A third-place finish in their first season saw them promoted to Division One, but they folded at the end of the 1991–92 season. After reforming, the club rejoined the Darlington & District League, winning it in 1998–99. They subsequently transferred to the Auckland & District League, which they won in 2000–01. The club were then promoted to the Wearside League, which was now operating with a single division. They won the League Cup in 2002–03, and were league champions in 2004–05, earning promotion to Division Two of the Northern League. Their first season in Division Two saw them finish third, earning promotion to Division One. However, they finished bottom of Division One in 2006–07 and were relegated back to Division Two. In 2017–18 the club finished second-from-bottom of Division Two and were relegated to the Wearside League

Season-by-season

Honours
Wearside League
Champions 2004–05
League Cup winners 2002–03
Auckland & District League
Champions 2000–01
Darlington & District League
Champions 1932–33, 1963–64, 1967–68, 1998–99
League Cup winners 1950–51, 1967–68
Durham Amateur Cup
Winners 1977–75
Sunderland Shipowners Cup
Winners 2004–05
North Riding Cup
Winners 1969–70

Records
Best FA Cup performance: Preliminary round, 2007–08
Best FA Vase performance: Second round, 1978–79
Biggest home win: 11–1 vs Glaxo, 6 January 2001; 11–1 vs Ferryhill Athletic, 2 April 2005
Biggest away win: 11–1 vs Byers Green 20 November 1999; 11–1 vs Wearhead United 28 October 2000
Heaviest home defeat: 1–7 vs Whitehaven 23 January 2010
Heaviest away defeat: 1–9 vs Morpeth Town 5 January 2013
Most goals in a season: Paul Freary, 24 (2005–06)
Record attendance: 585 vs Darlington 1883, friendly, 7 August 2012

See also
Darlington Railway Athletic F.C. players
Darlington Railway Athletic F.C. managers

References

External links
Official website

 
Football clubs in England
Football clubs in County Durham
Northern Football League
Teesside Football League
Wearside Football League
Darlington
Railway association football teams in England